"Feel Love" is a song by American singer-songwriter Sean Garrett featuring American rapper J. Cole. The song was released as the lead single from Garrett's upcoming second studio album on February 4, 2011. The song was originally included on his debut mixtape The Inkwell (2010), however that version featured Canadian rapper Drake instead of Cole.

Music video
The music video premiered on February 15, 2011 via Myspace. The video was directed by TAJ Stansberry.

Charts

References

2010 singles
2010 songs
J. Cole songs
Songs written by J. Cole
Songs written by Sean Garrett
Songs written by Drake (musician)